Luke Ronald Howarth (born 6 June 1972) is an Australian politician who has been a member of the House of Representatives since the 2013 federal election, representing the Division of Petrie. He is a member of the Liberal National Party of Queensland, and sits with the Liberal Party in federal parliament.

Early life and education 
Howarth was born in Brisbane, Queensland in 1972, to Ron and Denise Howarth, and grew up in Bracken Ridge. Howarth has one sister. 

He married his wife Louise in 1999, and they have three sons.

Howarth joined the LNP when he was 19 years old.

Career 
After leaving school, Howarth's first job was working at Barry Bull's Toombul Music. He worked at Sony Australia as a sales rep from 1993 to 2001. In 2002, Howarth joined his family's pest control business, alongside his mother, father and wife.

Political career 
In 2004, Howarth ran in the Queensland state election in the electoral district of Sandgate against the incumbent Labor MP Gordon Nuttall, however was unsuccessful despite a 10% swing to him.

At the 2013 federal election, Howarth won the seat of Petrie with a 3.04% swing to him, defeating the sitting ALP member, Yvette D'Ath, who had held the seat since the 2007 federal election. He was reelected at the 2016 federal election, with an increased 1.6% margin. In line with other Liberal National Party candidates in Queensland, there was a significant swing in the 2019 election, increasing the margin to 8.4%. In May 2022, Howarth won despite a 3.96% swing against him margin and became the first opposition MP to hold the seat in 35 years.

In August 2018, Howarth played a key role in the leadership spill which removed Prime Minister Malcolm Turnbull from his position.

In July 2019, Howarth spoke to ABC Radio National in his newly appointed role as the Assistant Minister for Community Housing, Homelessness and Community Services. Howarth announced he wanted to "put a positive spin on [homelessness]". He claimed that homelessness had reduced in the area of rough sleeping over the past 15 years from 8,926 people in 2001 to 8,200 people in 2016 despite a 20% increase in the population. However, this claim has mixed verdicts, as the figures disguise a sharp rebound in the number of rough sleepers over the most recent five-year period, where the 2011 census put the number of rough sleepers at 6,810 (a rate of 3.2 people per 10,000 of population) and risen by 20% to 8,200 (a rate of 3.5 per 10,000) by 2016.

Howarth served as the Assistant Minister for Youth and Employment Services from December 2020 until May 2022. Following the Liberal government's defeat in the 2022 election, Howarth was appointed as the Shadow Minister for Defence Industry and the Shadow Minister for Defence Personnel.

Howarth is a member of the National Right faction of the Liberal Party.

References

1972 births
Living people
Liberal National Party of Queensland members of the Parliament of Australia
Members of the Australian House of Representatives
Members of the Australian House of Representatives for Petrie
21st-century Australian politicians